Parliamentary elections were held in the Trust Territory of the Pacific Islands on 3 November 1970.

Electoral system
The bicameral Congress consisted of a 12-member Senate with two members from each of the six districts and a 21-member House of Representatives with seats apportioned to each district based on their population – five from Truk, four from the Marshall Islands and Ponape, three from the Mariana Islands and Palau and two from Yap.

Elections were held every two years in November of even-numbered years, with all members of the House of Representatives and half the Senate (one member from each district) renewed at each election.

Results

Senate

House of Representatives

Aftermath
Following the elections, the Progressive Party submitted a petition to annul the election results in Palau, where the Liberal Party had won all four contested seats (Roman Tmetuchl in the Senate and George Ngirarsaol, Timothy Olkeriil and Tarkong Pedro in the House of Representatives). The Progressives claimed that non-registered people had been able to vote, and ballots had been tampered with. A Senate committee subsequently recommended that the election of Tmetuchl be annulled. However, the Senate voted to allow Tmetuchl to take his seat, although the election of the three Palau House of Representatives members was annulled.

When the newly elected Congress met, Bethwel Henry of Ponape was re-elected Speaker of the House of Representatives and Amata Kabua of the Marshall Islands was re-elected President of the Senate.

The by-election for the three House of Representatives seats in Palau was held on 30 March, with Polycarp Basilius, Olkeriil and Pedro elected.

References

Trust Territory
Elections in the Federated States of Micronesia
Elections in the Marshall Islands
Elections in Palau
Elections in the Northern Mariana Islands
1970 in the Trust Territory of the Pacific Islands